The Santa Quiteria Chapel located in the municipality of Almassora, (Castellón Province, Spain) appears to have been documented since the first half of the seventeenth century.

History

There are some indications that this area was populated long before this date: a 1330 contract speaks about a church next to the Mijares; there was news of religious processions to neighbouring towns; in 1394, the inhabitants of Vila-real, mentioned, among other places, a town named Almassora, which is most likely Santa Quiteria;  a payment was made in 1495 to a hermit, to add a cell to the river's bridge, and a fifteenth-century coin was later found between the corners when work was being done on the roof.

Military hospital

1647 it is turned into a refuge and a hospital, coinciding with the plague that ravaged the nation. It was reconstructed and widened when the plague ended. Also in the War of the French, at the beginning of the 19th century, it served as a field hospital, that is, a French military hospital. It was rehabilitated for religious purposes in 1829.

Remodelling

The present Hermitage, which is a single story with simple steeples, is from 1682, according to Sarthou Carreres. It is documented that it underwent work in 1726, directed by Jose Vilavalle, who built the espadaña, the pulpit, part of the roof, the sacristy, the steps of the altar, the pavement and remodelled the outside. The pulpit, the center, as well as the main altar have disappeared, from 1726, surely the work of one of the Ochando brothers. It was consecrated again, after the 1936-1939 war ended, with a new image created by the Almassoran sculptor, Enrique Serra. It underwent several renovations in 1984 and 1991. To the left of the presbytery there is a painting by Enrique Limo containing a scene of the life of the saint. The current bell is modern, dating from 1940.

References

Christian hermitages in Spain
Buildings and structures in the Province of Castellón